Umala is a location in La Paz in Bolivia. It is the seat of the Umala Municipality, the second municipal section of the Aroma Province.

References 

  Instituto Nacional de Estadística de Bolivia  (INE)

Populated places in La Paz Department (Bolivia)